is a Japanese voice actress and singer from Gunma Prefecture.

Career 
In 2009, Ogura performed the motion capture for Hatsune Miku in the game Hatsune Miku: Project DIVA.

Ogura was a member of the Japanese idol duo YuiKaori with Kaori Ishihara. She was also a part of the idol unit StylipS (also with Ishihara, along with Arisa Noto and Maho Matsunaga), as well as pop group Happy Style Rookies. As a voice actress, Ogura has portrayed anime characters such as Hinata Hakamada in Ro-Kyu-Bu!, Yunoha Thru in Aquarion Evol, Kokona Aoba in Encouragement of Climb and Tsukiko Tsutsukakushi in The "Hentai" Prince and the Stony Cat. As a solo artist, Ogura's single Raise was used as the ending theme for the anime Campione!, and reached number 8 on the Oricon chart in 2012. Other character songs that Ogura sang for the anime characters she had voiced for have also charted. 

In 2016, Ogura changed agencies from Sigma Seven to Clare Voice. On March 31, 2017, it was announced that YuiKaori would halt activity on June 30 so that Ogura and Ishihara could focus on their solo careers. On June 30, 2017, YuiKaori went on a hiatus. Ogura graduated Showa Women's University with a bachelor's degree in Psychology in March 2018. On January 1, 2019, it was announced that Ogura has signed back with UP-FRONT under Just Production as a voice actress. Ogura left Just Production on March 31, 2021, and transferred to Atomic Monkey on April 1, 2021. Later that year, her song "Fightin★Pose" was used as the first opening theme to the anime series The Great Jahy Will Not Be Defeated!. 

Ogura left Atomic Monkey on April 1, 2022 and transferred to Style Cube on the same day. In August 2022, Ogura announced that she switched to Nippon Columbia as her record label.

Filmography

Anime
{| class="wikitable sortable plainrowheaders"
|+ List of voice performances in anime
! Year
! Title
! Role
! class="unsortable"| Notes
! class="unsortable"| Source
|-
| –10 || Yumeiro Patissiere || Ringo Koizumi, Mint || Also SP Professional || 
|-
|  || Kaitō Reinya  || Inspector's daughter || Episodes 10-11 || 
|-
|  || Maid Sama! || Various characters || || 
|-
|  || Kissxsis || Girl || || 
|-
| –13 || Oreimo || Tamaki Goko || 2 season ||  
|-
|  || Sket Dance || Suzu Chūma || Episodes 45, 58, 68, 77 || 
|-
| –13 || Ro-Kyu-Bu! series || Hinata Hakamada || Also SS and OVAs in 2013 || 
|-
|  || Heaven's Memo Pad || Alice || || 
|-
|  || Mayo Chiki! || Choco || || 
|-
|  || C³ || Kuroe Ningyohara || ||  
|-
| –15 || High School D×D series || Katase || || 
|-
|  || Aquarion Evol || Yunoha Suroor || Also Love OVA in 2015 as Yuno Kawazu  || 
|-
|  || Saki Achiga-hen Episode of Side-A || Toki Onjōji  || || 
|-
|  || Tsuritama || Sakura Usami || || 
|-
|  || Hyouka || Kayo Zenna || || 
|-
|  || Nakaimo - My Sister is Among Them! || Yuzurina Houshou   || || 
|-
|  || Campione! || Athena || Solo singing debut with ending theme song.  Episodes 1–4, 8-13 || 
|-
|  || The Ambition of Oda Nobuna || Takenaka Hanbee || || 
|-
| –13 || The Pet Girl of Sakurasou || Yūko Kanda || || 
|-
| –22 || Encouragement of Climb series || Kokona Aoba || 4 seasons || 
|-
|  || The "Hentai" Prince and the Stony Cat. || Tsukiko Tsutsukakushi || || 
|-
|  || Hyperdimension Neptunia: The Animation || Rom || || 
|-
|  || Yozakura Quartet ~Hana no Uta~ || Kohime Sakurano || Episodes 4, 7-9 || 
|-
|  || Unbreakable Machine-Doll || Komurasaki || || 
|-
|  || Recently, My Sister Is Unusual || Hiyori Kotobuki || || 
|-
|  || Z/X Ignition || Azumi Kagamihara || || 
|-
|  || Inu Neko Hour: 47 Todoufuken R || Gunma Dog || || 
|-
|  || Black Bullet || Midori Fuse || || 
|-
| –15 || Cross Ange || Chris || Episodes 1–8, 10–13, 17-25 || 
|-
|  || Girl Friend Beta || Momoko Asahina || || 
|-
|  || Yurikuma Arashi || Sumika Izumino || || 
|-
|  || [[Dog Days (Japanese TV series)|Dog Days]] || Aria ||  || 
|-
|  || World Break: Aria of Curse for a Holy Swordsman || Maya Shimon || || 
|-
| –17 || Teekyu series || Tomarin || Seasons 4-9 || 
|-
|  || Castle Town Dandelion || Hikari Sakurada || || 
|-
|  || Wooser's Hand-to-Mouth Life: Mugen-hen || Various characters || || 
|-
|  || Shimoneta || Binkan-chan || || 
|-
| –16 || Ultra Super Anime Time || Sumaco || Anime programming block co-host || 
|-
|  || Cardfight!! Vanguard G: Stride Gate || Remy Altena || || 
|-
|  || Twin Star Exorcists || Miku Zeze || || 
|-
|  || Regalia: The Three Sacred Stars || Tia || || 
|-
|  || Vivid Strike! || Rinne Berlinetta || || 
|-
|  || Akiba's Trip: The Animation || Pyuko || Episode 6 || 
|-
| –present || Masamune-kun's Revenge || Kinue Hayase || 2 seasons || 
|-
|  || Schoolgirl Strikers: Animation Channel || Mana Namori || || 
|-
|  || KonoSuba 2 || Axis Cultist (Classmate Impersonator) || Episodes 8-10 || 
|-
|  || Hinako Note || Mayuki Hiiragi || || 
|-
|  || Seven Mortal Sins  || Beelzebub || || 
|-
|  || Hina Logi from Luck & Logic || Karin Kiritani || || 
|-
|  || Tsuredure Children || Ayaka Kamine || || 
|-
|  || My First Girlfriend Is a Gal || Nene Fujinoki || ||
|-
|  || UQ Holder! Magister Negi Magi! 2 || Karin Yuuki || || 
|-
| –18 || Hozuki's Coolheadedness 2 || Zashikiwarashi Niko || || 
|-
|  || Pop Team Epic || Sosogu Hoshifuri || ||
|-
|  || Basilisk: The Ōka Ninja Scrolls || Senhime || ||
|-
| –22 || Teasing Master Takagi-san || Sanae Tsukimoto || 3 seasons || 
|-
|  || The Ryuo's Work Is Never Done! || Charlotte Izoard || ||
|-
|  || Hugtto! PreCure || Homare Kagayaki / Cure Étoile || || 
|-
|  || Omae wa Mada Gunma o Shiranai || Teruna "Ietty" Ieki || || 
|-
|  || Crossing Time || Tomo || || 
|-
|  || Ongaku Shōjo || Haori Mukae, Uori Mukae || || 
|-
|  || Yuuna and the Haunted Hot Springs || Yaya Fushiguro || || 
|-
|  || Boarding School Juliet || Teria Wan || || 
|-
| –present || Goblin Slayer || Priestess || || 
|-
|  || My Sister, My Writer || Mai Himuro || || 
|-
|  || Pastel Memories || Chimari Maiko || || 
|-
|  || Arifureta: From Commonplace to World's Strongest || Myu || || 
|-
|  || African Office Worker || Gorimi || || 
|-
|  || Z/X Code reunion || Azumi Kagamihara || || 
|-
| –22 || Magia Record: Puella Magi Madoka Magica Side Story || Sana Futaba || || 
|-
|  || Infinite Dendrogram || Cyco || || 
|-
| –22 || Science Fell in Love, So I Tried to Prove It || Arika Yamamoto || || 
|-
|  || A Destructive God Sits Next to Me || Chikako || || 
|-
| –21 || Shadowverse || Alice Kurobane || || 
|-
|  || Dogeza: I Tried Asking While Kowtowing || Minori Gakesaka, Yua Aneha, Ayame Omoi || || 
|-
|  || Black Clover || Vanica Zogratis || || 
|-
|  || So I'm a Spider, So What? || Sue || || 
|-
|  || My Next Life as a Villainess: All Routes Lead to Doom! X || Selena Burke || || 
|-
|  || The Great Jahy Will Not Be Defeated! || Kokoro || || 
|-
|  || Gunma-chan || Mimi || || 
|-
| –present || Waccha PriMagi! || Hanitan || || 
|-
| –22 || Platinum End || Nasse || || 
|-
|  || Pokémon Ultimate Journeys: The Series || Marnie || || 
|- 
|  || The Greatest Demon Lord Is Reborn as a Typical Nobody || Verda El Hazard || || 
|- 
|  || Miss Shachiku and the Little Baby Ghost || Miko-chan || || 
|- 
|  || Rent-A-Girlfriend || Shiori || || 
|- 
|  || The Human Crazy University || Chie Negishi || || 
|- 
|  || More Than a Married Couple, But Not Lovers || Mei Hamano || || 
|- 
|  || Kantai Collection: Let's Meet at Sea || Amatsukaze || || 
|- 
|  || The Reincarnation of the Strongest Exorcist in Another World || Yuki || || 
|- 
|  || Isekai Shōkan wa Nidome Desu || Shironeko || || 
|- 
|  || Yuri Is My Job! || Hime Shirasagi || || 
|- 
|}

OVA/ONA

Animated films

Video games

Drama CDs

DubbingInvader Zim: Enter the Florpus (Gaz)The Boss Baby: Family Business'' (Tina Templeton)

Discography

Singles

Albums

Live Videos

References

External links 
  
 Official agency profile 
 Yui Ogura at Nippon Columbia 
 Yui Ogura at Oricon 
 

1995 births
Living people
Anime singers
Japanese idols
Japanese lyricists
Japanese video game actresses
Japanese voice actresses
Japanese YouTubers
King Records (Japan) artists
Musicians from Gunma Prefecture
Nippon Columbia artists
Showa Women's University alumni
StylipS members
Voice actresses from Gunma Prefecture
YuiKaori members
21st-century Japanese actresses
21st-century Japanese singers
21st-century Japanese women singers